Dolgoji Station is a railway station on Seoul Subway Line 6, located in Seongbuk-gu, Seoul. Its name comes from the hangeul reading of the hanja name (石串) of Seokgwan-dong.

Station layout

References 

Railway stations opened in 2000
Metro stations in Seongbuk District
Seoul Metropolitan Subway stations